Patelisio Punou-Ki-Hihifo Finau (15 March 1934 – 4 October 1993) was the second Roman Catholic Bishop of Tonga born in Tonga.

He was also, from 1978 to 1982, president of CEPAC.

See also

Roman Catholicism in Tonga

References

1933 births
1993 deaths
20th-century Roman Catholic bishops in Tonga
People from Tongatapu
Roman Catholic bishops of Tonga
Tongan Roman Catholic bishops